Clinical Schizophrenia & Related Psychoses is a quarterly peer-reviewed medical journal published by Walsh Medical Media. It covers research in all areas of psychiatry, especially schizophrenia, bipolar disorder, and related psychoses. The editor-in-chief is Peter F. Buckley (Virginia Commonwealth University).

Abstracting and indexing
The journal is abstracted and indexed in EMBASE, EBSCO databases, and  Scopus. From 2010–2019 it was also index by MEDLINE/PubMed.

References

Psychiatry journals
English-language journals
Quarterly journals
Publications established in 2007